The Other Side is the sixth studio album by gothic industrial metal band Gothminister, released on 13 October 2017 on the label AFM Records.

Track listing

Reception

The album has received positive reviews from critics.

References 

2017 albums
Gothminister albums
AFM Records albums